Shì is a Chinese surname. It is not among the 400 most common surnames according to a 2013 study.

Notable people
 Shi Ci (士賜), the administrator of Rinan Commandery in the Eastern Han dynasty
 Shi Xie (士燮) (137–226), Shi Ci's son and the administrator of Jiaozhi Commandery in the Eastern Han dynasty and early Three Kingdoms period
 Shi Xin (士廞), Shi Xie's eldest son
 Shi Zhi (士祗), Shi Xie's second son
 Shi Hui (士徽) (165–227), Shi Xie's third son and successor as the administrator of Jiaozhi Commandery in the early Three Kingdoms period
 Shi Gan (士幹), Shi Xie's fourth son
 Shi Song (士頌), Shi Xie's fifth son
 Shi Hui (士䵋), Shi Xie's brother and the Administrator of Jiuzhen Commandery in the Eastern Han dynasty
 Shi Yi (士壹), Shi Xie's brother and the administrator of Hepu Commandery in the Eastern Han dynasty
 Shi Kuang (士匡), Shi Yi's son
 Shi Wu (士武), Shi Xie's brother and the administrator of Nanhai Commandery in the Eastern Han dynasty

Other surnames transliterated Shì

是

 Shi Yi (是儀), official of the Eastern Wu state in the Three Kingdoms period
 Jay Shih (是元介), a Taiwanese actor, singer and television host.

釋 / 释

釋 is a common surname for Chinese Buddhist monks and nuns. The practice started with the monk Dao'an (312–385), who advocated that all monks and nuns adopt 釋 as their surname, from the Chinese abbreviation of Gautama Buddha's title, Shijiamounifo (釋迦牟尼佛 "Śākyamuni").

Individual Chinese surnames